Hartwood Presbyterian Church, also known as the Yellow Chapel Church, is a historic Presbyterian church located at the junction of VA 705 and 612 in Hartwood, Stafford County, Virginia.  It was built between 1857 and 1859, and is a rectangular brick Greek Revival style church.  The church was restored in 1866, after having been used by both sides during the American Civil War.  During the war, it was the site of Wade Hampton's November 1862 capture of 137 men of the 3rd Pennsylvania Cavalry. The property includes the site of the Hartwood Chapel
or Yellow Chapel of about 1767 and a graveyard.  Hartwood Presbyterian Church was the only Presbyterian church in Stafford County from about 1807 until 1983.

It was listed on the National Register of Historic Places in 1989.

References

External links
Hartwood Presbyterian Church website
Fredericksburg, Stafford, Spotsylvania Historical Markers: Hartwood Presbyterian Church E-126

19th-century Presbyterian church buildings in the United States
Presbyterian churches in Virginia
Churches on the National Register of Historic Places in Virginia
Greek Revival church buildings in Virginia
Churches completed in 1866
National Register of Historic Places in Stafford County, Virginia
Churches in Stafford County, Virginia
1859 establishments in Virginia